Yeon Je-woon (born August 28, 1994) is a South Korean footballer who plays as forward for Seongnam FC.

Career
Jo Ju-young joined Seongnam FC in January 2016. He made his first appearance for Seongnam in the league game against Jeonbuk on June 12. He scored his debut goal in the league game against Sangju on 10 July.

References

External links 
 

1994 births
Living people
Association football defenders
South Korean footballers
Seongnam FC players
K League 1 players
K League 2 players